The Twelfth Canadian Ministry was the first cabinet chaired by Prime Minister William Lyon Mackenzie King.  It governed Canada from 29 December 1921 to 28 June 1926, including the 14th Canadian Parliament and most of the 15th.  The government was formed by the Liberal Party of Canada.  Mackenzie King was also Prime Minister in the Fourteenth and Sixteenth Canadian Ministries.

Ministers
Prime Minister
29 December 1921 – 29 June 1926: William Lyon Mackenzie King
Minister of Agriculture
29 December 1921 – 29 June 1926: William Richard Motherwell
Minister of Customs and Excise
29 December 1921 – 5 September 1925: Jacques Bureau
5 September 1925 – 29 June 1926: Georges Henri Boivin
Secretary of State for External Affairs
29 December 1921 – 29 June 1926: William Lyon Mackenzie King
Minister of Finance
29 December 1921 – 5 September 1925: William Stevens Fielding
5 September 1925 – 29 June 1926: James Robb
Receiver General of Canada
29 December 1921 – 29 June 1926: The Minister of Finance (Ex officio)
29 December 1921 – 5 September 1925: William Stevens Fielding
5 September 1925 – 29 June 1926: James Robb
Minister presiding over the Department of Health
29 December 1921 – 15 April 1926: Henri Sévérin Béland
15 April 1926 – 29 June 1926: John Campbell Elliott
Minister of Immigration and Colonization
29 December 1921 – 3 January 1922: Vacant (William J. Black was acting)
3 January 1922 – 20 February 1922: Hewitt Bostock (acting)
20 February 1922 – 17 August 1923: Charles Stewart
17 August 1923 – 7 September 1925: James Robb
7 September 1925 – 13 November 1925: George Newcombe Gordon
13 November 1925 – 29 June 1926: Charles Stewart (acting)
Superintendent-General of Indian Affairs
29 December 1921 – 29 June 1926: The Minister of the Interior (Ex officio)
29 December 1921 – 29 June 1926: Charles Stewart
Minister of the Interior
29 December 1921 – 29 June 1926: Charles Stewart
Minister of Justice 
29 December 1921 – 4 January 1924: Sir Jean Lomer Gouin
4 January 1924 – 30 January 1924: Ernest Lapointe (acting)
30 January 1924 – 29 June 1926: Ernest Lapointe
Attorney General of Canada
29 December 1921 – 28 June 1926: The Minister of Justice (Ex officio)
29 December 1921 – 4 January 1924: Lomer Gouin
4 January 1924 – 30 January 1924: Ernest Lapointe (acting)
30 January 1924 – 29 June 1926: Ernest Lapointe
Minister of Labour
29 December 1921 – 13 November 1925: James Murdock
13 November 1925 – 8 March 1926: James Horace King (acting)
8 March 1926 – 29 June 1926: John Campbell Elliott
Leader of the Government in the Senate
29 December 1921 – 29 June 1926: Raoul Dandurand
Minister of Marine and Fisheries
29 December 1921 – 30 January 1924: Ernest Lapointe
30 January 1924 – 29 June 1926: Pierre Joseph Arthur Cardin
Minister of Militia and Defence 
29 December 1921 – 1 January 1923: George Perry Graham
Minister of Mines
29 December 1921 – 29 June 1926: Charles Stewart
Minister of National Defence
1 January 1923 – 28 April 1923: George Perry Graham
28 April 1923 – 17 August 1923: Edward Mortimer Macdonald (acting)
17 August 1923 – 29 June 1926: Edward Mortimer Macdonald
Minister of the Naval Service
29 December 1921 – 1 January 1923: George Perry Graham
Postmaster General
29 December 1921 – 29 June 1926: Charles Murphy
President of the Privy Council
29 December 1921 – 29 June 1926: William Lyon Mackenzie King
Minister of Public Works
29 December 1921 – 3 February 1922: Hewitt Bostock
3 February 1922 – 29 June 1926: James Horace King
Minister of Railways and Canals
29 December 1921 – 19 January 1923: William Costello Kennedy
19 January 1923 – 28 April 1923: Vacant (Graham Airdrie Bell was acting)
28 April 1923 – 1 March 1926: George Perry Graham
1 March 1926 – 29 June 1926: Charles Avery Dunning
Secretary of State of Canada
29 December 1921 – 26 September 1925: Arthur Bliss Copp
26 September 1925 – 13 November 1925: Walter Edward Foster
13 November 1925 – 24 March 1926: Charles Murphy (acting)
24 March 1926 – 29 June 1926: Ernest Lapointe
Registrar General of Canada
29 December 1921 – 28 June 1926: The Secretary of State of Canada (Ex officio)
29 December 1921 – 26 September 1925: Arthur Bliss Copp
26 September 1925 – 13 November 1925: Walter Edward Foster
13 November 1925 – 24 March 1926: Charles Murphy (acting)
24 March 1926 – 29 June 1926: Ernest Lapointe
Minister of Soldiers' Civil Re-establishment
29 December 1921 – 15 April 1926: Henri Sévérin Béland
15 April 1926 – 29 June 1926: John Campbell Elliott
Solicitor General of Canada
29 December 1921 – 11 April 1923: Daniel Duncan McKenzie
11 April 1923 – 14 November 1923: Vacant 
14 November 1923 – 23 May 1925: Edward James McMurray
23 May 1925 – 5 September 1925: Vacant
Minister of Trade and Commerce
29 December 1921 – 17 August 1923: James Robb
17 August 1923 – 13 November 1925: Thomas Andrew Low
13 November 1925 – 29 June 1926: James Robb (acting)
Minister without Portfolio
29 December 1921 – 29 June 1926: Raoul Dandurand
29 December 1921 – 17 August 1923: Thomas Andrew Low
30 December 1921 – 30 October 1925: John Ewen Sinclair
12 April 1923 – 17 August 1923: Edward Mortimer Macdonald
20 September 1924 – 30 October 1925: Harold McGiverin
9 September 1925 – 7 January 1926: Herbert Meredith Marler
16 September 1925 – 13 November 1925: Vincent Massey
20 February 1926 – 7 April 1926: George Perry Graham

Offices not of the Cabinet
Parliamentary Secretary of Soldiers' Civil Re-establishment
29 December 1921 – 29 June 1926: Vacant

Solicitor General of Canada
5 September 1925 – 29 June 1926: Lucien Cannon

Not of the Ministry
Parliamentary Under Secretary of State for External Affairs
29 December 1921 – 27 October 1922: Lucien Turcotte Pacaud

References

Succession

12
1921 establishments in Canada
1926 disestablishments in Canada
Cabinets established in 1921
Cabinets disestablished in 1926
Ministries of George V